Hattie Gossett (born 11 April 1942) is an African-American feminist playwright, poet, and magazine editor. Her work focuses on bolstering the self-esteem of young black women.

Biography
Born in New Jersey, Gossett gained a Master of Fine Arts degree from New York University in 1993, where she was a Yip Harburg Fellow. She was a David Randolph Distinguished Artist-in-Residence at The New School in 2001.

Gossett was "involved in the planning stages" of Essence magazine, which was first published in 1970, and she was an early participant in the Kitchen Table: Women of Color Press collective founded in 1980 by Audre Lorde and Barbara Smith. Gossett was also a staff editor with True Story, Redbook, McCall's and black theater magazines, and subsequently taught and did workshops on writing, black literature, and black music at Rutgers University, SUNY Empire State College, Oberlin College, and elsewhere.

Gossett's poetry collection Presenting...Sister Noblues was published by Firebrand Books in 1988. Her poem "between a rock and a hard place" is incorporated into the dance work Shelter by Jawole Willa Jo Zollar, as performed by the Alvin Ailey American Dance Theater beginning in 1995. Gossett contributed a slave narrative style reading to the Andrea E. Woods dance Rememorabilia, Scraps From Out a Tin Can, Everybody Has Some. She is also the author of the book the immigrant suite: hey xenophobe! Who you calling foreigner? (2007).

Her work has appeared in many publications, including Artforum, Black Scholar, The Village Voice, Conditions, Essence, Jazz Spotlite News, Pleasure and Danger: Exploring Female Sexuality, This Bridge Called My Back, and Daughters of Africa.

Publications
 Presenting...Sister Noblues, Firebrand Books, 1988, 
 the immigrant suite: hey xenophobe! who you calling foreigner?, Seven Stories Press, 2007,

References

External links
 Hattie Gossett page at The Feminist eZine.

1942 births
20th-century African-American women writers
20th-century American women writers
20th-century African-American writers
21st-century African-American people
21st-century African-American women writers
21st-century American women writers
21st-century African-American writers
African-American poets
African-American women musicians
American feminist writers
American performance artists
American women academics
American women dramatists and playwrights
American women poets
Feminist theatre
Living people
New York University alumni
The New School faculty
Writers from New Jersey